Gareth Sansom (born 19 November 1939) is an Australian artist, painter, printmaker and collagist and winner of the 2008 John McCaughey Memorial Prize of $100,000.

Best known for introducing new themes and subject-matter into Australian art and being one of the first Australian artists to be influenced by Pop art, particularly British Pop artists like Peter Blake, Allen Jones, Derek Boshier, Joe Tilson and the formal strategies of the post-modernist R. B. Kitaj. Another major Influence was and remains the British painter Francis Bacon. He was an associate of Brett Whiteley and there was a likely mutual influence. Sansom has had a distinct influence on subsequent Australian art, paving the way for later notable artists such as Juan Davila and Howard Arkley.  His work is represented by the National Gallery of Australia, the National Gallery of Victoria, the Art Gallery of New South Wales, the Metropolitan Museum of Art, New York and the Mertz Collection. His paintings are eclectic, studded with allusions both historical, cultural and personal. There is something almost diaristic about his work, but its presentation is anything but linear and logical. Abiding themes are mortality, ageing, sexual identity, popular and youth culture and cinema. There is also a strong element of humour, iconoclasm and irony in his work, from their titles, such as "Art Can't Fart (for Rose Selavay)", "Four Wise Men Looking for God in Abstract Art", "Dr Fu Manchu's Death by Gyro" or "Ship of Fools (Hello sailor!)" to comic and grotesque figurative elements and their sometimes lurid but highly resolved colour schemes. On a technical level his paintings combine oils, enamels (both sprayed and applied with brush) and collaged elements from personal photographs to objects stuck on or painted over. Stylistically Sansom uses a wide array of painting techniques but signature devices include allowing earlier layers of paint to remain visible, hard-edge geometric shapes juxtaposed with playful, lyrical, more organic or atmospheric passages of paint and figurative "doodles", often at the margins of the paintings.

Early career
Sansom studied at the Royal Melbourne Institute of Technology, (now RMIT University), from 1959 to 1964. He held his first solo exhibition in 1959 at Richman Gallery in Melbourne. He asked Arthur Boyd to open the exhibition and Boyd agreed. Boyd also purchased a painting from the show. After his studies at RMIT, two exhibitions were at South Yarra Gallery, in 1965 (from which the National Gallery of Victoria purchased the work, 'He Sees Himself'), and Gallery A, in 1966 (from which The National Collection - now Australian National Gallery - purchased the work 'Leaving that well known void'). In 1968 he painted 'The Great Democracy, where his influences can be readily discerned. (This painting is now in the collection of the Australian National Gallery, Canberra).

During the 1970s, Sansom began to experiment with self-portrait photographs involving images of himself dressed as a woman. In particular Sansom developed a series of photographs in which he portrayed Hollywood film noir icons such as Barbara Stanwyck and Joan Crawford. Two series of works on cardboard using these photographs as collaged items within graphic media and paint were shown at Warehouse Gallery, Melbourne, in 1975 and 1977.

In 1978, RMIT Gallery presented a major survey of Sansom's paintings and graphic works covering the period 1964–1978. Sansom was head of painting at the VCA School of Art, prior to becoming Dean in 1986.

Mid career
In 1982, Sansom was a visiting artist at the Stedelijk Museum in Amsterdam and in 1985 he was Artist-in-Residence at The University of Melbourne.

In 1991, Sansom represented Australia at the Indian Triennial held in New Delhi. At this event he exhibited watercolours made while he lived for six months in New Delhi, in 1989. His aim had been to make one watercolour per day during this period, using humble materials, but on archival paper. Many aspects of contemporary Indian life and culture infiltrated the modus operandi of these works.

Back in Australia these watercolors were exhibited at Roslyn Oxley9Gallery in 1990 ('Out of India'), and at the Ian Potter Museum of Art at the University of Melbourne in 1991. From 1986 to 1991 Sansom was Dean of the School of Art at the Victorian College of the Arts (VCA).

In 1991 Sansom resigned from the VCA.

Recent career
In 2005, a career survey of Sansom's work, titled "Welcome to my mind: Gareth Sansom, a study of selected works 1964-2005 ", was held at the Ian Potter Gallery at The University of Melbourne. In 2008, Sansom won the John McCaughey Memorial Prize. The judge, Alex Baker, the National Gallery of Victoria's senior curator of contemporary art, said of Sansom's work:
"The balance between figuration and abstraction, the self-investigatory aspect of the work, the psychedelic aspect, all really hit me as being very much of the moment. I think younger artists should really look at this guy's work to understand what's going on in contemporary painting."

Sansom stated recently that"In my earlier days it was always firmly about being anti-intellectual and beating my chest. It seems somewhat foolish now. Nowadays I am open to anything that's going to make my paintings better. Where I had always relied on spontaneity I've realised you have to raise the bar and part of that is intellectually."

Sansom (now in his eighties) has recently returned to earlier themes in his paintings by inserting digital photographs of himself in various disguises using latex horror masks and realistic female masks, as well as incorporating latex prosthetics of female body parts; his aim being to create an uneasy tension between the literalness of the photographs and the painterliness within the paintings, which can veer wildly between abstraction and figuration.

Sansom is married to the painter Christine Healy. He lives and works in Melbourne and Sorrento, and is currently represented by STATION Gallery, in Melbourne: the Milani Gallery in Brisbane, Queensland; and the Roslyn Oxley9 Gallery in Sydney, NSW.

In 2016 the artist participated in the exhibition 'Magic Object' - Adelaide Biennial at the Art Gallery of South Australia. He also featured in the important survey show of Australian painting, Painting, More Painting, mounted at ACCA (Australian Centre for Contemporary Art), Melbourne. Also in 2016, Sansom was included in Today, Tomorrow, Yesterday, held at the Museum of Contemporary Art Australia (MCA), Sydney.

In 2016 Sansom was interviewed in a digital story and oral history for the State Library of Queensland's James C Sourris AM Collection. Sansom spoke about his life, art practices and his success at winning the Hugh Williamson Prize; the McCaughey Memorial Prize; and the Dobell Prize for Drawing.

In October 2017, the artist was invited to speak at the seminar, 'Artist to Artist: Gareth Sansom', during which, he discussed his work as an artist, and his important and influential role as an art educator. This event was staged as part of 'ART150' at the Victorian College of the Arts, Melbourne, Australia, which celebrated 150 years of art in Melbourne.

In 2017–2018, the Ian Potter Centre: NGV Australia staged a major retrospective of Sansom's work, 'Gareth Sansom: Transformer'. Over 130 works were featured in the exhibition, including many ground-breaking pieces that had not been previously seen in public. The exhibition comprised: suites of works on paper; photography; watercolours; collages; and paintings - including many works from the past 15 years. The show was opened by Pulitzer Prize-winning writer, Sebastian Smee, whose essay about the show stated that Sansom had a lack of sentimentality about "our darker natures; for the parts of us that idle along during the day, purring harmlessly beneath the surface of our charming, careful, mildly-anxious social selves, but that intermittently growl, bark or stare inappropriately; that come out at night, and are liable to erupt in spasms of desire, violence and teeth-baring, and are tempted by self-annihilation. Art critic for the Sydney Morning Herald, John McDonald, wrote of the exhibition's: "sheer, crazed abundance. Part fun-house, part warehouse, the show is bursting with paintings, collages, photos, objects and memorabilia. There are veins of pure kitsch, grotesquerie, dark eroticism".

In 2019, Sansom was included in the exhibition, Ways of Seeing: recent acquisitions from the collection, staged at the Art Gallery of South Australia, Adelaide. In the same year, his work was showcased in Berlin, in the exhibition, STATION at Arndt Art Agency (formerly Arndt & Partner).

Awards and Prizes
 1975 Visual Arts Board, Special Projects Grant
 1976 Visual Arts Board, Travel Grant
 1979 Victorian Ministry of the Arts, Tram Project
 1982 Visiting Artist Stedelijk Museum, Amsterdam, the Netherlands
 1984 Hugh Williamson Prize, Ballarat Fine Art Gallery
 1986 Henry Salkauskas Art Award
 1987 ANZ Bicentennial Commissioning Series
 1989 Victorian Tapestry Workshop Commission
 1991 VII - The Indian Triennale, New Delhi
 1993/94 Collie Fellowship, Australian Print Workshop, Melbourne
 1994 Virtuosi - Youth Music Australia Portfolio of Prints
 2006 John Tallis Acquisitive Award, Mornington Peninsula Art Gallery
 2008 John McCaughey Memorial Prize, National Gallery of Victoria
 2012 Dobell Prize for Drawing

Collections

 Metropolitan Museum of Art, New York
 National Gallery of Victoria, Melbourne
 Museum of New Zealand Te Papa Tongarewa, Wellington, New Zealand
 Museum of Contemporary Art, Sydney
 Australian National Gallery, Canberra
 Art Gallery of Western Australia, Perth
 Art Gallery of New South Wales, Sydney
 Art Gallery of South Australia, Adelaide
 Tasmanian Museum and Art Gallery, Hobart
 Artbank, Sydney
 Gallery of Modern Art, Brisbane
 Museum of Modern Art at Heide, Victoria
 Geelong Art Gallery, Victoria
 Shepparton Art Gallery, Victoria
 Benalla Art Gallery, Victoria
 Ballarat Fine Art Gallery, Victoria
 Bendigo Art Gallery, Victoria
 Mornington Peninsula Art Gallery, Victoria
 Wollongong City Art Gallery, New South Wales
 Newcastle Region Art Gallery, New South Wales

References

 Present Day Art in Australia, Mervyn Horton, 1968
 A Guide to Modern Australian Painting, Ross Luck, Melbourne, 1969
 Australian Painting of the Sixties, Kym Bonython, Rigby, 1970
 Australian Painting, Bernard Smith, Oxford University Press, 1972
 Australian Painting, 1970–1975, Kym Bonython, Rigby, 1976
 Gareth Sansom, Graeme Sturgeon, Art & Australia, December, 1977
 Australian Painting 1975-1980, Kym Bonython, Rigby, 1980
 The Years of Hope, Australian Art and Criticism, 1959–1968, Gary Catalano, Oxford University Press, 1981
 Vision in Disbelief, William Wright, Catalogue Essay, 4th Biennale of Sydney, Art Gallery of New South Wales, 1982
 Vox Pop: into the eighties catalogue, National Gallery of Victoria, 1983
 Perspecta catalogue, Art Gallery of New South Wales, 1983
 Australian Painting 1788 - 1990, Bernard Smith, Oxford University Press, 1991
 Welcome to My Mind - Gareth Sansom, A Study of Selected Works 1964-2005, Bala Starr, The University of Melbourne, 2005
 Gareth Sansom, Julian Holcroft, LIKE magazine, December 2000.
 Two Centuries of Australian Art from the Collection of the National Gallery of Victoria, Bernard Smith, Thames & Hudson, 2004
 Untitled: Portraits of Australian Artists, Sonia Payes, Macmillan, 2007
 Eye to I, Catalogue, Geoff Wallis, Ballarat Fine Art Gallery, 2007
 A Skilled Hand and Cultivated Mind - A Guide to the Architecture and Art of RMIT University, Harriet Edquist, Elizabeth Grierson, RMIT, 2008
 Gareth Sansom, Ashley Crawford, Australian Art Review, August – October, 2008
 The Naked Face: Self Portraits, Vivien Gaston, Catalogue, NGV, 2010
 Standout Exhibitions, Ashley Crawford, Australian Art Collector, January/March, 2012
 101 Contemporary Australian Artists, Kelly Gellatly NGV Publication, 2012
 Gareth Sansom: Mind Grenades, Ashley Crawford, VAULT magazine, 2015

External links
 Official website
 Gareth Sansom digital story, educational interview and oral history. John Oxley Library, State Library of Queensland, 21 December 2016. 8min, 30min and 1:18min version available to view online.

1939 births
Living people
Australian male painters
Artists from Melbourne
Australian LGBT painters